KTVQ (channel 2) is a television station in Billings, Montana, United States, affiliated with CBS and The CW Plus. Owned by the E. W. Scripps Company, it is part of the Montana Television Network, a statewide network of CBS-affiliated stations. KTVQ's studios are located on Third Avenue North in Billings, and its transmitter is located on Sacrifice Cliff southeast of downtown.

History
The Montana Network, owner of radio station KOOK (970 AM), applied on December 13, 1952, for a construction permit to build a new TV station on channel 2 in Billings, which was granted by the Federal Communications Commission (FCC) on February 4, 1953. The turnaround time was short considering that Robert S. Howard, who owned Scripps-associated radio and newspaper holdings in Utah and Idaho, had also applied for channel 2, but his firm dropped its bid and cleared the way for The Montana Network. KOOK had already revealed it had held an option for two years to build a transmitter site on Coburn Hill. Ground was broken on the studio and transmitter facilities there in early June, and programming from KOOK-TV began on November 9, 1953. It was the third station in the state: Butte's KXLF-TV had begun in August, and a second station, KOPR-TV, had started there at about the same time. KOOK-TV was affiliated with CBS, ABC and the DuMont Television Network at launch.

In December 1956, Joseph Sample acquired majority control of KOOK radio and television from its previous ownership, headed by Charles L. Crist, a state representative. A year later, KOOK broke ground on a new radio and television center in downtown Billings, which was completed in 1959; three homes were moved off the property before construction began. By the time the building was completed, a second television station, KGHL-TV (channel 8, now KULR-TV), had begun in 1958.

Sample later expanded his holdings across the state. In 1961, he acquired KXLF in Butte; in 1969, he purchased KRTV in Great Falls, giving his Garryowen Broadcasting coverage of half the state's population. The Montana Television Network was formed that same year from these stations and KPAX-TV in Missoula, which was built in 1970. In 1972, seeking to get ahead of a proposed FCC rule that would have barred radio-television cross-ownership, Sample sold KOOK radio; the call letters were retained by the radio station, and the television station changed its call sign to KTVQ on September 5, 1972. The new designation was chosen because the station had exhausted its preferred options, it was available, "Q2" (which became the station's moniker) was a branding option, and due to a since-repealed FCC regulation prohibiting TV and radio stations in the same market, but different ownership, from sharing the same call signs.

In 1968, channel 2 picked up a secondary affiliation with NBC after KULR opted to take a primary affiliation with ABC. The two stations shared NBC programming. This was unusual for a two-station market. In most two-station markets, especially those as small as Billings, it was ABC that was relegated to off-hours clearances. However, KTVQ retained right of first refusal for NBC programming. In 1979, for instance, KTVQ aired 17 CBS prime time shows and 10 from NBC; ABC shows were all seen on KULR, which rounded out its schedule with five additional shows not cleared by KTVQ. In 1980, KTVQ became a primary CBS affiliate. KOUS (channel 4) launched late that year and immediately took all NBC programming that KTVQ did not clear; NBC fare aired by KTVQ at the time included The Today Show, The Tonight Show, and several prime time shows, and some of these programs lasted on channel 2 until KTVQ's NBC affiliation contract ended in 1982.

After nearly 27 years owning KTVQ and feeling "burned out" with television, Sample sold the Montana Television Network in 1983 to SJL Broadcasting. Evening Post Industries (through its Cordillera Communications subsidiary) bought it in 1994 for $8.5 million; this reunited KTVQ with the rest of MTN, which it had purchased in 1986. Scripps closed on its purchase of the Cordillera broadcast properties, including MTN, in 2019.

News operation
In 1971, MTN instituted a hybrid local-regional newscast format. The network news was presented from Great Falls, as that was the only place that could receive feeds from all of the MTN stations at the same time; the Billings, Butte, and (from 1977) Missoula stations presented local news inserts into the statewide program. However, in Billings, KTVQ had long been the second-place news finisher behind KULR-TV.

One of Sample's last acts as owner of MTN, at the same time he sold the network to Lilly, was to move production of MTN News from Great Falls to Billings in hopes that it would improve MTN's laggard position in the Billings news ratings. Ed Coghlan, who had been the lead anchor from Great Falls, was replaced by Dean Phillips. The order of the newscast was changed to put the local inserts first, and MTN's long-running Today in Montana—which also originated in Great Falls—added news and weather segments aired from Billings. Despite the use of longer interview segments and in-depth reports, Phillips's style was often seen as too big-city for Montanans; Vic Bracht of The Billings Gazette cited an "arrogance factor" that became known even to people who did not watch MTN. Phillips was replaced by Gus Koernig, and the station's ratings immediately improved. In February 1987, both Arbitron and Nielsen found KTVQ to be beating KULR-TV in all time slots. By 1997, KTVQ enjoyed a two-to-one ratings advantage over its competitor for its early evening newscast.

In 1995, President Bill Clinton visited Billings and KTVQ, where he conducted a televised town hall meeting.

In 1990, KTVQ's newscasts began to be seen on KXGN-TV channel 5 in Glendive when that station joined MTN.

Technical information

Subchannels
The station's digital signal is multiplexed:

In February 2009, the four major commercial stations in the Billings market were refused Federal Communications Commission permission to end analog broadcasts and operate as digital-only effective on the originally-scheduled February 17, 2009 date.

Translators

References

External links
KTVQ.com - Official KTVQ-TV website
CWBillings.com - Official CW Billings website 

CBS network affiliates
Grit (TV network) affiliates
Defy TV affiliates
Scripps News affiliates
Montana Television Network
Television channels and stations established in 1953
1953 establishments in Montana
TVQ
E. W. Scripps Company television stations